Yiedie Khan (也咥可汗), personal name Yishibo (乙失缽), was a seventh-century Turkic political leader of the Xueyantuo, the first to have taken the title of khan.

At the time of Yishibo's rule over the Xueyantuo, the Xueyantuo were a part of the Chile confederation, made of 15 tribes, which at the time submitted to Western Tujue's Heshana Khan Ashina Daman (r. 603-611).  Ashina Daman was said to be collecting excessive taxes from the Chile, leading to resentment among the Chile.  Ashina Daman thus suspected the Chile chieftains and, on one occasion, gathered some 100 Chile chieftains and slaughtered them.  The Chile thereafter rebelled and supported Geleng (歌楞), the chieftain of the Qibi (契苾), as the Yiwuzhenmohe Khan (易勿真莫賀可汗).  They also supported Yishibo as Yiedie Khan, as a subordinate khan under Geleng.  Later, after Western Tujue's Shekui Khan (r. 611-619) came to power, it was said that the Chile again submitted to Western Tujue rule and that both Geleng and Yishibo renounced their khan titles as part of the submission.  The Xueyantuo would not have another khan until Yishibo's grandson Yi'nan, then a vassal of the Eastern Tujue, rebelled against Eastern Tujue and was created the Zhenzhu Khan by Emperor Taizong of Tang.

Notes and references 

 Zizhi Tongjian, vol. 192.

Xueyantuo khans
7th-century rulers in Asia
Founding monarchs